The Mahones are a  Canadian Irish punk band, formed on St. Patrick's Day in 1990, in Kingston, Ontario.

Biography
The Mahones were formed in 1990 by Dublin-born Finny McConnell, as a one-off band for a St. Patrick's Day party. Encouraged by a positive reception, McConnell decided to pursue the band full-time. The Mahones have released thirteen albums to date with their most recent, Jameson Street, being released in 2022 being named the top celtic punk album of the year and have continually received high praise for their energetic live show ever since.

The Mahones’ music has been featured in several major motion pictures. They co-wrote and recorded the title track for the 1996 film Celtic Pride with Dan Aykroyd. Their song "100 Bucks" was featured in the 1998 film Dog Park. Their song "Paint The Town Red" was featured in the climactic final fight scene of the 2010 Oscar Award-winning film The Fighter.  Their song "A Little Bit of Love" is in the 2011 film Irvine Welsh's Ecstasy.

The Mahones have shared stages and toured with bands such as Dropkick Murphys, Stiff Little Fingers, Shane MacGowan and The Popes, Billy Bragg, Chuck Ragan, UK Subs, Sick of It All, The Defects, Agnostic Front, The Buzzcocks, D.O.A., Against Me, The Tragically Hip, Crash Vegas, The Damned, Suicidal Tendencies, The Prodigy, Gwar, Skunk Anansie, Blue Rodeo, Steve Earle, The Alarm, Sinéad O'Connor, Roger Miret and the Disasters, Dylan Walshe, Flogging Molly, Spirit of the west, The Dubliners, Christy Moore, The Band and Van Morrison. The band’s cited influences included The Clash, The Pogues, Greenland Whalefishers, The Who, and Hüsker Dü. The group’s lineup has changed a number of times, with McConnell as the main constant member. Pogues members Terry Woods and Phil Chevron joined the band on tour in 2003.

In 1999, bassist Joe Chithalen died in Amsterdam shortly after a concert. He had accidentally ingested food containing peanuts, to which he was allergic. The Joe Chithalen Memorial Musical Instrument Lending Library, Joe’s M.I.L.L., was established in Kingston soon after by Wally High. The Mahones perform fundraising concerts for Joe's M.I.L.L. annually.

In 2010, The Mahones started their own record label, Whiskey Devil Records, and signed a distribution deal with eOne Music.

In 2014, The Mahones were nominated Best Punk Band at the Sirius XM Indie Awards. In 2012, The Mahones' album The Black Irish won the Independent Music Award for Best Punk Album, and Angels & Devils won Paddy Rock Radio's album of the year, as well as Vandala Concepts' album of the year 

In 2016, Scruffy Wallace joined the band bagpipe player. Wallace was a member of Dropkick Murphys for 12 years.

Name
The Mahones cite The Pogues as a main influence. That band were originally called Pogue Mahone (an anglicisation of an Irish phrase meaning "kiss my arse"), but later shortened it to The Pogues. "The Mahones" is seen as similarly derived from Pogue Mahone, as a tribute to The Pogues.

Members
Current members
 Finny McConnell - lead vocals, guitar, mandolin, songwriter
 Sean "R!ot" Ryan - bass,  vocals
 Michael O'Grady - tin whistle, vocals
 Stephen McGrath - drums

Former members 
 Katie "Kaboom" McConnell - accordion, vocals
 Dom Whelan - drums
 Guillaume Lauzon - drums
 Scruffy Wallace - bagpipes
 Chris Ward
 Colm McConnell
 Paul Mancuso 
 "The" Barry Williams
 Andrew Brown
 Ger O'Sullivan
 Mauro Sepe
 Owen Warnica
 David Allen
 Kevan Williams
 Paddy Concannon
 Miranda Mulholland
 Chris Scahill
 Chris Smirnios
 Greg McConnell
 Ewen McIntosh
 Joe Chithalen
 Sean Winter
 Eryk Chamberland
 Mike Franey
 Jamie Oliver (Drummer)

Discography

Studio albums

Live albums

Compilations

Demo

Singles

References

Musical groups established in 1990
Musical groups from Kingston, Ontario
Canadian punk rock groups
Canadian folk rock groups
Celtic punk groups
1990 establishments in Ontario
Canadian Celtic music groups